Laurent Timothée Marie Wauquiez (born 12 April 1975) is a French politician who has presided over the Regional Council of Auvergne-Rhône-Alpes since 2016. He is a member of The Republicans (LR), which he led from 2017 to 2019 following the resignation of Nicolas Sarkozy.
 
Wauquiez was Secretary of State for European Affairs under the Foreign Minister Alain Juppé; and previously Secretary of State for Employment under the Minister of the Economy, Industry and Employment from March 2008 in François Fillon's government. He also was Government Spokesman from June 2007 to March 2008 as Minister of State under the Prime Minister. He was elected as 2nd Vice President of the ORU Fogar at the organisation's General Assembly held in Quito, Ecuador on 16 October 2016.

On 10 December 2017, Wauquiez was elected to the presidency of The Republicans with 74% of the vote. Pundits have described him as moving the party to the right. On 2 June 2019, a week after overseeing the worst result for the right in its history in the European election with 8% of the vote, Wauquiez announced his resignation as party president.

Early life and education 
Wauquiez graduated from the École normale supérieure and Université Panthéon-Sorbonne with a masters in history and studied public law at the Institut d'études politiques de Paris (Sciences Po); he later attended the École nationale d'administration (ÉNA). He worked as professor at Emlyon Business School.

Political career 
Wauquiez held several governmental positions over the course of Nicolas Sarkozy's presidency. He was named the Secretary of State for Employment in 2008 and also functioned as the government spokesman. He later served as Minister of European Affairs and of Higher Education. In 2012, he was re-elected to the National Assembly and became head of the Auvergne-Rhône-Alpes region in 2015. 

On 10 December 2017, Wauquiez was elected as the president of The Republicans, winning over Maël de Calan and Florence Portelli. During his time in office, he overrode party scepticism to appoint François-Xavier Bellamy to lead the LR list in the European elections. He resigned in June 2019, bowing to pressure to step down after a his party’s weak performance in the elections.

In August 2021, Wauquiez announced his decision not to run as the Republicans’s candidate in the 2022 presidential election.

Personal life 
Wauquiez is known for wearing a red parka coat.

List of mandates and functions

Governmental functions 
Minister of Higher Education and Research: 2011-2012

Minister for European Affairs: 2010-2011

Secretary of State to the Prime Minister, Government Spokesperson: 2007-2008

Secretary of State for Employment: 2008-2010

Electoral mandates

National Assembly of France 
Member of the National Assembly of France for Haute-Loire's 1st constituency : 2004-2007 (He became secretary of State in 2007) / Since 2012. Elected in 2004 (by-election), reelected in 2007 and 2012.

Regional Council 
President of the Regional Council of Auvergne-Rhône-Alpes : since 2016

Municipal Council 
Mayor of Le Puy-en-Velay : 2008-2016 (Resignation). Reelected in 2014.

Municipal councillor of Le Puy-en-Velay : 2008-2016 (Resignation). Reelected in 2014.

Notes and references

Notes

References

External links
Official government profile 

1975 births
Living people

Deputies of the 12th National Assembly of the French Fifth Republic
Deputies of the 13th National Assembly of the French Fifth Republic
Deputies of the 14th National Assembly of the French Fifth Republic
Presidents of the Regional Council of Auvergne-Rhône-Alpes
Regional councillors of Auvergne-Rhône-Alpes
École Normale Supérieure alumni
École nationale d'administration alumni
Academic staff of Emlyon Business School
21st-century French politicians
Government ministers of France
Government spokespersons of France
Lycée Henri-IV alumni
Lycée Louis-le-Grand alumni
Mayors of places in Auvergne-Rhône-Alpes
Politicians from Lyon
Sciences Po alumni
Secretaries of State of France
Union for a Popular Movement politicians
The Republicans (France) politicians
The Social Right
Presidents of French regions and overseas collectivities
French Roman Catholics